Lenki is a rural locality (a selo) and the administrative center of Lenkovsky Selsoviet, Blagoveshchensky District, Altai Krai, Russia. The population was 3,232 as of 2013. There are 52 streets.

Geography 
Lenki is located 52 km northeast of Blagoveshchenka (the district's administrative centre) by road. Alexeyevka is the nearest rural locality.

References 

Rural localities in Blagoveshchensky District, Altai Krai